This is a list of airports in Iceland.
There are no railways in Iceland. Driving from Reykjavík to Akureyri takes 4-5 hours compared to 45 minutes flight time, driving from Reykjavík to Egilsstaðir takes 9 hours compared to 1 hour flight time.

Airports 

Airport names shown in bold have scheduled passenger service on commercial airlines.

Not listed are former military airports and airbases Naval Air Station Keflavik (which is now Keflavik International Airport), RAF Reykjavik (which is now Reykjavik Airport) and RAF Kaldadarnes (which is now abandoned). Also not listed are smaller airfields like Sandskeið glider airfield.

See also 
 Transport in Iceland
 List of airports by ICAO code: B#BI - Iceland
 Wikipedia: Airline destination lists: Europe#Iceland
 List of the largest airports in the Nordic countries

References 

 
 
  – includes IATA codes
  – ICAO codes and airport data
  – IATA and ICAO codes

 
Iceland
Airports
Airprts
Iceland